Upper Chandmari Ward is a ward located under Nagaland's capital city, Kohima. The ward falls under the designated Ward No. 12 of the Kohima Municipal Council.

Education
Educational Institutions in Upper Chandmari Ward:

Schools 
 Chandmari Higher Secondary School
 Genesis School
 Government High School

See also
 Municipal Wards of Kohima

References

External links
 Map of Kohima Ward No. 12

Kohima
Wards of Kohima